Irby Brown (March 25, 1928 – May 28, 2016) was an American painter known for his paintings of the Southwest, particularly his snow scenes. Born in Paris, Texas, he studied under Olin H.Travis at the Dallas Art Institute for three and a half years.  Brown sold his first landscape painting under commission at the age of 13 years old.  He is represented by the Ventana Gallery in Santa Fe, New Mexico.

References

External links
  Official website
  Irby Brown landscape paintings

20th-century American painters
21st-century American painters
2016 deaths
1928 births
Landscape artists
People from Paris, Texas
Artists from Texas